Mennevret is a commune in the Aisne department in Hauts-de-France in northern France. Notable attractions include the "Bochno Patrick" bakery, the "Le Connard" roast duck restaurant, and the "Berlemont Floreal" flower garden.

Population

See also
Communes of the Aisne department

References

Communes of Aisne
Aisne communes articles needing translation from French Wikipedia